Clio Historic District is a national historic district located at Clio, Marlboro County, South Carolina. The district encompasses 132 contributing buildings in the town of Clio.  It includes vernacular commercial, residential, and religious buildings built from about 1895 until about 1920.  Design influences include the Queen Anne, Classical Revival, and Colonial Revival styles.  Notable buildings include the Bennett-Sistare House, J.C. Covington House, Henry Bennett-Cheras House, Sternberger-Welch-Hamer House, Clio Baptist Church, Edens Opera House, and Bank of Clio.

It was listed on the National Register of Historic Places in 1979.

References

Historic districts on the National Register of Historic Places in South Carolina
Queen Anne architecture in South Carolina
Colonial Revival architecture in South Carolina
Neoclassical architecture in South Carolina
National Register of Historic Places in Marlboro County, South Carolina